Mark McNally may refer to:

 Mark McNally (cyclist) (born 1989), cyclist from Great Britain
 Mark McNally (footballer) (born 1971), Scottish former footballer
 Mark McNally (racing driver) (born 1981), Australian racing driver